Catfish in Black Bean Sauce is a 2000 comedy-drama film directed by Chi Muoi Lo in his directorial debut about a Vietnamese brother and sister raised by an African American couple. The film stars Chi Muoi Lo, Paul Winfield, Sanaa Lathan, and Mary Alice.

Cast
 Chi Muoi Lo as Dwayne Williams/Sap
 Sanaa Lathan as Nina
 Paul Winfield as Harold Williams
 Mary Alice as Dolores Williams
 Lauren Tom as Mai
 Kieu Chinh as Thanh
 Tyler Christopher as Michael
 Tzi Ma as Vinh
 George Wallace as James
 Wing Chen as Samantha
 Amy Tran as Young Mai
 Kevin Lo as Young Dwayne/Sap
 Kevin D’Arcy as Guard 1
 Andre Rosey Brown: Guard 2
 Ron Galbraith as Doctor
 Calvin Nguyen as Teacher
 Richard F. Whiten as Motorcycle Cop
 Lalanya Master as Bank Teller
 Mark Daniel Cade as Assistant Bank Manager
 Jedda Jones as Agnes
 Roxanne Reese as Nadine
 Saachiko Magwili as Mother
 William Thomas as Douglas
 April Tran as Interpreter
 Thomas Ryan as Lt. Davis
 Carol Kiernan as Nurse
 Thu Hong: Opera Singer
 Ho Lo as Man at Airport
 Vien Hong as Transvestite

Reviews
The film has received mixed reviews. A Los Angeles Times review noted that as the film's writer/director/actor Chi Muoi Lo "spread himself too thin, resulting in an uneven picture but one that has plenty of substance and emotion". Roger Ebert wrote that the film was "a first draft for a movie that could have been extraordinary".  The San Francisco Chronicle noted that the film was "a comedy of interracial wariness and misunderstanding marked by a refreshing lack of sappiness".

Awards and nominations

References

External links
 
 
 

1990s coming-of-age comedy-drama films
1999 films
Films about adoption
American coming-of-age comedy-drama films
Films about Vietnamese Americans
American independent films
Films about race and ethnicity
Comedy-drama films about Asian Americans
African-American comedy-drama films
1999 comedy films
1999 drama films
2000s English-language films
1990s English-language films
1990s American films
2000s American films